Lahoot Lamakan is a sacred cave in Balochistan, Pakistan.

Shrine 
Tuhfat al-Kiram — primarily, a chronicle of Sufis in Sindh by Mir Ali Sher Qaune Thattvi (c. mid-eighteenth century) — that one Bilawal Shah Noorani of Thatta was afflicted by divine frenzy, and had to leave the town in the late fiteenth century during the reign of Jam Nizamuddin II. He ventured west of Thatta and ended up in the valley, usurping the orchards of one Gokal Seth.

The site draws thousands of Shia Muslim pilgrims every year, who take a fortnight-long pilgrimage to the valley, starting from the shrine of Lal Shahbaz Qalandar Sehwan and stopping by at small shrines (or stations) in the way. However, the primary subject of veneration is not Shah Noorani but Ali, a cousin of Muhammad and the first Shia Imam. A footprint is alleged to be that of Ali, cast while he had dismounted from his horse to fight "Gokul Deo"; another footprint is attributed to the hoof of his horse. There is also a cave, where Shah Noorani had allegedly spent his last days; inside lies a stone which is argued to be the image of Ali's camel.

Notes

References

External links
 A blog chronicling the pilgrimage

Khuzdar District
Caves of Pakistan